Sydney Frederick Hammond (1882 – 18 October 1917) was an English professional footballer who played as a full back in the Southern League for West Ham United.

Personal life
Hammond was married and worked as a commercial clerk. At the outbreak of the First World War, he enlisted in the Royal Field Artillery. While serving as a corporal, Hammond was killed in action on 17 October 1917 during the Battle of Passchendaele. He was buried in La Clytte Military Cemetery.

Career statistics

References

External links

1882 births
1917 deaths
Footballers from Woolwich
Association football fullbacks
English footballers
Southern Football League players
West Ham United F.C. players
British Army personnel of World War I
British military personnel killed in World War I
Royal Field Artillery soldiers